Events from the year 1807 in Germany saw a major battle in Danzig and the loss of a third of Prussian land to Napoleon to form the Duchy of Warsaw.

Incumbents

Kingdoms 
 Kingdom of Prussia
 Monarch – Frederick William III of Prussia (16 November 17977 June 1840)
 Kingdom of Bavaria
 Maximilian I (1 January 180613 October 1825)
 Kingdom of Saxony
 Frederick Augustus I (20 December 18065 May 1827)
 Kingdom of Württemberg
 Frederick I (22 December 179730 October 1816)

Grand Duchies 
 Grand Duke of Baden
 Charles Frederick (25 July 180610 June 1811)
 Grand Duke of Hesse
 Louis I (14 August 18066 April 1830)
 Grand Duke of Mecklenburg-Schwerin
 Frederick Francis I (24 April 17851 February 1837)
 Grand Duke of Mecklenburg-Strelitz
 Charles II (2 June 17946 November 1816)
 Grand Duke of Oldenburg
 Wilhelm (6 July 17852 July 1823) Due to mental illness, Wilhelm was duke in name only, with his cousin Peter, Prince-Bishop of Lübeck, acting as regent throughout his entire reign.
 Peter I (2 July 182321 May 1829)
 Grand Duke of Saxe-Weimar
 Karl August  (1758–1809) Raised to grand duchy in 1809

Principalities 
 Schaumburg-Lippe
 George William (13 February 17871860)
 Schwarzburg-Rudolstadt
 Louis Frederick II (13 April 179328 April 1807)
 Friedrich Günther (28 April 180728 June 1867)
 Schwarzburg-Sondershausen
 Günther Friedrich Karl I (14 October 179419 August 1835)
 Principality of Lippe
 Leopold II (5 November 18021 January 1851)
 Principality of Reuss-Greiz
 Heinrich XIII (28 June 180029 January 1817)
 Waldeck and Pyrmont
 Friedrich Karl August  (29 August 176324 September 1812)

Duchies 
 Duke of Anhalt-Dessau
 Leopold III (16 December 17519 August 1817)
 Duke of Brunswick
 Frederick William (16 October 180616 June 1815)
 Duke of Saxe-Altenburg
 Duke of Saxe-Hildburghausen (1780–1826)  - Frederick
 Duke of Saxe-Coburg and Gotha
 Ernest I (9 December 180612 November 1826)
 Duke of Saxe-Meiningen
 Bernhard II (24 December 180320 September 1866)
 Duke of Schleswig-Holstein-Sonderburg-Beck
 Frederick Charles Louis (24 February 177525 March 1816)

Events 
 25 January – Battle of Mohrungen
 3 February –  Battle of Allenstein
 March2 July – Siege of Kolberg
 April 1–3 – Great Sortie of Stralsund
 24 May – Siege of Danzig ends after 6 weeks with Prussian and Russian defenders capitulating to French forces.
 5/6 June – Battle of Guttstadt-Deppen
 10 June  – Battle of Heilsberg
 7–9 July – The Treaties of Tilsit are signed between France, Prussia and Russia. Napoleon and Russian Emperor Alexander I ally together against the British. The Prussians are forced to cede more than half their territory, which is formed into the Duchy of Warsaw in their former Polish lands, and the Kingdom of Westphalia in western Germany. The Free City of Danzig is also formed (established 9 September by Napoleon).
 24 July-24 August – Siege of Stralsund
 7/8 October – Battle of Eylau
 9 October – Prussian Reform Movement: Serfdom is abolished by the October edict.
Ludwig Order established.
Morgenblatt für gebildete Stände established.

Births 
 4 February – Max Emanuel Ainmiller, German glass painter (died 1870)
 30 June – Friedrich Theodor Vischer, German author (died 1887)
16 November – Eduard von Fransecky, Prussian general (died 1890)
 8 December – Friedrich Traugott Kützing, German pharmacist, botanist and phycologist (died 1893)

Deaths 
 10 April – Duchess Anna Amalia of Brunswick-Wolfenbüttel, regent of Weimar and Eisenach (born 1739)
 19 December – Friedrich Melchior, Baron von Grimm, German writer (born 1723)

References 

Years of the 19th century in Germany
 
Germany
Germany